The World's Greatest Gospel Singer is Mahalia Jackson's debut album on the Columbia label, recorded in 1954.

Overview

Original record sleeve, written by George Avakian: "The recordings in this collection were made in the course of two consecutive evenings at Columbia's 30th Street Studio in New York City. For Mahalia's debut on the Columbia Label, Mitch Miller had asked her to prepare some new songs for single record release, and I had hoped to get a start toward making an album of spirituals and gospels songs of her own choice. Mahalia surprised and pleased us mightily. In a few hours, she made half a dozen single sides for Mitch and almost an album and a half for me. The only reason we quit was that there was limit to the amount of material we could absorb all at once."

Recording session

November 23, 1954, Columbia, New York City, with The Falls-Jones Ensemble: Mildred Falls (piano), Ralph Jones (organ), Jack Lasberg (guitar), Frank Carroll (bass), Bunny Shawker (drums), and Mahalia Jackson (vocal). Columbia CL 644; Originally Released March 14, 1955.

Track listing

Footnotes 

1955 debut albums
Albums produced by George Avakian
Columbia Records albums
Mahalia Jackson albums
Albums recorded at CBS 30th Street Studio